V. Hanumantha Rao (aka VHR, Hanumantha Rao Vuthpulla) is a political leader from the Indian National Congress party. He is former AICC(All India Congress Committee) Secretary of Congress Party in Telangana. He was the Member of Parliament of Rajya Sabha. After Bifurcation of Andhra Pradesh he is allotted to Telangana state by draw of lots.

Other information
 2004–present:Secretary, AICC
 2010-16: MP, Rajya Sabha elections
 2004-10: MP, Rajya Sabha elections
 1992-98: MP, Rajya Sabha elections
 1989-92: MLA, Andhra Pradesh Congress Committee (Amberpet constituency )
 1988-98: President, Andhra Pradesh Congress Committee (APCC)
 1985-88: Joint Secretary, Andhra Pradesh Congress Committee (APCC)
 1979-83: President, Andhra Pradesh Youth Congress
 1978-83:MLA, Andhra Pradesh Legislative Assembly(Amberpet Assembly Constituency )

References

External links
 Profile on Rajya Sabha website

Indian National Congress politicians
1948 births
Telugu politicians
Osmania University alumni
Living people
Politicians from Hyderabad, India
Telangana politicians
Rajya Sabha members from Andhra Pradesh
Rajya Sabha members from Telangana